Kiboga General Hospital, also Kiboga Hospital, Kiboga Main Hospital or Kiboga District Hospital, is a hospital in the Central Region of Uganda.

Location

The coordinates of Kiboga General Hospital are:0°54'43.0"N, 31°46'35.0"E (Latitude:0.911937; Longitude:31.776378).

Overview
Kiboga Hospital first opened at a different location in the town, as a dispensary and maternity unit in 1960. Following lobbying by the area member of parliament, construction began at the present suite for a fully fledged hospital in the late 1960s. The present hospital complex was commissioned in 1973. The hospital serves parts of the following districts: Kiboga, Kyankwanzi,  Kibaale, Nakaseke,  Mubende, and Hoima The hospital, whose bed capacity is 210, is severely understaffed, underfunded and operates with old antiquated equipment.

See also
List of hospitals in Uganda

References

External links
 Website of Uganda Ministry of Health
 Kiboga District Information Portal

Hospital buildings completed in 1960
Kigoga
Kiboga District
Central Region, Uganda
1960 establishments in Uganda